James Jeffrey Griffith (February 13, 1916 – September 17, 1993) was an American character actor, musician and screenwriter.

Education
Griffith attended Santa Monica High School, where he was a classmate with Glenn Ford. Both were active in school drama productions. He later graduated from UCLA with a degree in music.

Career
Born in Los Angeles, Griffith aspired to be a musician rather than an actor. Instead after graduating from University of California, Los Angeles, he managed to find work in little theatres around Los Angeles, where the budding musician eased into a dual career of acting. He found success in the production They Can't Get You Down in 1939, but put his career on hold during World War II to serve with the United States Marine Corps. Following the war, Griffith switched from the stage to films when he appeared in the 1948 film noir picture Blonde Ice. From then on, he enjoyed a lengthy career of supporting and bit roles (sometimes uncredited) in westerns and detective films.

Though Griffith was generally cast as the outlaw in Western pictures, he managed to garner a few memorable "good guy" roles over his many years in Hollywood –  Abraham Lincoln in both 1950's Stage to Tucson and 1955's Apache Ambush, sheriff Pat Garrett in 1954's The Law vs. Billy the Kid, and Davy Crockett in 1956's The First Texan. In 1957, he co-starred on Gunsmoke, playing a simple farmer involved in a feud in S3E16's "Twelfth Night", as well as in other episodes.

In 1959, Griffith appeared as John Wesley Hardin on the TV western Maverick in the episode titled "Duel at Sundown" featuring James Garner and Clint Eastwood.

In the role of Aaron Adams, the town barber, Griffith appeared in 1958 in twelve episodes of the CBS western series, Trackdown.

Griffith also portrayed deputy Tom Ferguson in the syndicated series, Sheriff of Cochise, starring John Bromfield, and U.S. Marshal.

Griffith made more than seventy guest appearances on television shows, including eight episodes of Wagon Train, seven episodes of The Range Rider, seven episodes of The Lone Ranger, two episodes of Annie Oakley, four episodes of Cheyenne, three episodes of Buffalo Bill, Jr., six episodes of Gunsmoke, four episodes of Perry Mason, four episodes of Dragnet, three episodes (42, 43 and 108) of Batman, and two segments of Little House on the Prairie.

Throughout his acting career, Griffith continued to practice his original love of music, having performed in the Spike Jones band. He composed music for the 1958 film Bullwhip and the 1964 picture, Lorna, in which he also had a role and served as screenwriter. Griffith played the Reverend in Black in the opening, closing, and a few in the middle scenes of Lorna, starring Lorna Maitland in one of director Russ Meyer's black-and-white 'skin' movies before the height of Meyer's career in 1968 with Beyond the Valley of the Dolls.

Griffith made his last onscreen appearance in a 1984 episode of CBS's Trapper John MD.

Death
Griffith died of cancer in Avila Beach, California, on September 17, 1993.

Filmography

References

External links

 

1916 births
1993 deaths
Male actors from Los Angeles
American male film actors
American male screenwriters
Deaths from cancer in California
Musicians from Los Angeles
Male Western (genre) film actors
People from San Luis Obispo County, California
20th-century American male actors
American male television actors
20th-century American musicians
Western (genre) television actors
Screenwriters from California
20th-century American male writers
20th-century American screenwriters
United States Marine Corps personnel of World War II
University of California, Los Angeles alumni